

Events

January

 January 1
 The General Agreement on Tariffs and Trade (GATT) is inaugurated.
 The Constitution of New Jersey (later subject to amendment) goes into effect.
 The railways of Britain are nationalized, to form British Railways.
 January 4 – Burma gains its independence from the United Kingdom, becoming an independent republic, named the Union of Burma, with Sao Shwe Thaik as its first President, and U Nu its first Prime Minister.
 January 5 
 Warner Brothers shows the first color newsreel (Tournament of Roses Parade and the Rose Bowl Game).
 The first Kinsey Report, Sexual Behavior in the Human Male, is published in the United States.
 January 7 – Mantell UFO incident: Kentucky Air National Guard pilot Thomas Mantell crashes while in pursuit of an unidentified flying object.
 January 12 – Mahatma Gandhi begins his fast-unto-death in Delhi, to stop communal violence during the Partition of India.
 January 17 – A truce is declared between nationalist Indonesian and Dutch troops in Java.
 January 22 – British foreign secretary Ernest Bevin proposes the formation of a Western Union between Britain, France, and the Benelux countries, to stand up against the Soviet Union. The Treaty of Brussels is signed March 17 as a consequence, a predecessor to NATO.
 January 26 – Teigin poison case: a man masquerading as a doctor poisons 12 of 16 bank employees of the Tokyo branch of Imperial Bank and takes the money; artist Sadamichi Hirasawa is later sentenced to death for the crime, but is never executed.
 January 29 – A DC-3 aircraft crash at Los Gatos Creek, near Coalinga, California, kills 4 US citizens and 28 deportees, commemorated in a protest song (Deportee (Plane Wreck at Los Gatos)) by Woody Guthrie.
 January 30
 Assassination of Mahatma Gandhi: Indian pacifist and leader Mahatma Gandhi is shot by Nathuram Godse in New Delhi.
 The 1948 Winter Olympics open in St Moritz, Switzerland.
 January 31 – The British crown colony of the Malayan Union, Penang and Malacca form the Federation of Malaya.

February

 February 1 
 The Soviet Union begins to jam Voice of America broadcasts.
 The Federation of Malaya is proclaimed.
 February 4 – Ceylon (later known as Sri Lanka) becomes an independent kingdom, within the British Commonwealth.
 February 11 – General Douglas Gracey becomes Commander-in-chief of Pakistan Army.
 February 16 – Miranda, innermost of the large moons of Uranus, is discovered by Gerard Kuiper.
 February 18 – Éamon de Valera, Irish head of government from 1918 to 1932, loses power to an opposition coalition. John A. Costello is appointed Taoiseach by President Seán T. O'Kelly, until 1960.
 February 19 – The Conference of Youth and Students of Southeast Asia Fighting for Freedom and Independence convenes in Calcutta.
 February 21 – The United States stock car racing organization NASCAR is founded by Bill France, Sr. with other drivers.
 February 22 – The first of the Ben Yehuda Street bombings in Jerusalem kills between 49 and 58 civilians, and injures between 140 and 200.
 February 25 – 1948 Czechoslovak coup d'état: Edvard Beneš, President of Czechoslovakia, cedes control of the country to the Communist Party, a day celebrated by that regime as "Victorious February" until November 1989.
 February 28
Accra Riots: Riots take place in Accra, capital of the British colony of Gold Coast, when a peaceful protest march by ex-servicemen is broken up by police, leaving several members of the group dead, among them Sergeant Adjetey, one of the leaders.
The 2nd Congress of the Communist Party of India convenes in Calcutta.

March

 March 8 – McCollum v. Board of Education: The United States Supreme Court rules that religious instruction in public schools violates the U.S. Constitution.
 March 12 – The Costa Rican Civil War begins.
 March 17
 The Treaty of Brussels is signed by Belgium, France, Luxembourg, the Netherlands and the United Kingdom, providing for economic, social and cultural collaboration and collective self-defence.
 The Hells Angels motorcycle gang is founded in California.
 March 18 – The Round Table Conference convenes in The Hague, Netherlands, to prepare the decolonization process for the Caribbean island of Aruba and the other Dutch Colonies. Aruba presents the mandate of the Aruban People for Aruba to become an independent country, under the sovereignty of the House of Orange, based on Aruba's first state constitution presented officially since August 1947, and a (4th) member state of the future Dutch Commonwealth.
 March 20
 Singapore holds its first elections.
 Renowned Italian conductor Arturo Toscanini makes his television debut, conducting the NBC Symphony Orchestra in an all-Wagner program in the United States.
 The 20th Academy Awards Ceremony is held in Los Angeles. Gentleman's Agreement wins the Academy Award for Best Picture.

April

 April – Children's Supermart, as predecessor of toys and children relative retailer brand Toys "R" Us, is founded in Washington D.C., United States.  
 April 1 – Physicists Ralph Asher Alpher and George Gamow publish the Alpher–Bethe–Gamow paper, about the Big Bang.
 April 3
 United States President Harry S. Truman signs the Marshall Plan, which authorizes $5 billion in aid for 16 countries.
 Jeju Uprising: Residents revolt on Jeju island, South Korea, eventually leading to the deaths of between 14,000 and 30,000.
 Beethoven's Symphony No. 9 is played on television in its entirety for the first time, in a series of concerts featuring Arturo Toscanini conducting the NBC Symphony Orchestra in the United States. The chorus is conducted by Robert Shaw.
 April 5 – 1947–48 Civil War in Mandatory Palestine: Haganah launches Operation Nachshon, provoking the 1948 Palestinian exodus.
 April 7–  The World Health Organization is established by the United Nations.
 April 9
 Jorge Eliécer Gaitán's assassination provokes a violent riot in Bogotá (the Bogotazo), and a further 10 years of violence (La Violencia) across Colombia.
 The Deir Yassin massacre takes place, in British Mandatory Palestine.
 April 13 – The Hadassah medical convoy massacre takes place, in British Mandatory Palestine.
 April 16 – The Organisation for Economic Co-operation and Development is founded, as the Organisation for European Economic Co-operation (OEEC).
 April 18 – Italian general election, 1948: The first democratic general election with universal suffrage is held in Italy. The Christian Democracy party achieves a majority over the Popular Democratic Front Communist-Socialist coalition.
 April 19 
 Burma joins the United Nations.
 The American Broadcasting Company (otherwise known as ABC) begins television services, on WFIL-TV in Philadelphia (later WPVI-TV).
 April 22
 Civil War in Mandatory Palestine: Battle of Haifa – Jewish paramilitary group Haganah captures Haifa from the Arab Liberation Army.
 WTVR begins television services. WTVR is the first TV station south of Washington D.C., giving it the nickname "The South's First Television station".
 April 23 – First National Games of Pakistan held in Karachi.
 April 24 – The Costa Rican Civil War ends.
 April 30 
 The Organization of American States (OAS) is founded.
 The English-built Land Rover is unveiled at the Amsterdam Motor Show.

May

 May – The RAND Corporation is established, as an independent nonprofit policy research and analysis institution, in the United States.
 May 9 – Solar eclipse of May 9, 1948: An annular solar eclipse is visible in Japan and South Korea, and is the 32nd solar eclipse of Solar Saros 137. This eclipse is very short, lasting just 0.3 seconds. The path width is just about 200 meters wide (approximately 218 yards).
 May 11 – Luigi Einaudi becomes President of the Italian Republic.

 May 14 – The Israeli Declaration of Independence is made. David Ben-Gurion becomes the first prime minister, a provisional position that will become formalized on February 14, 1949.
 May 15
 1948 Arab–Israeli War: The British Mandate of Palestine is officially terminated; expeditionary forces from Egypt, Transjordan, Syria and Iraq invade Israel, and clash with Israeli forces.
 The murder of a 3-year-old girl in Blackburn, England, leads to the fingerprinting of more than 40,000 men in the city, in an attempt to find the murderer.
 Australian cricket team in England in 1948: The touring Australians set an all-time first-class record, by scoring 721 runs in a day against Essex.
 May 16 – Chaim Weizmann is elected as the first President of Israel. New York City Fire Department Rescue 5 is founded for Staten Island.
 May 18 – The first Legislative Yuan of the Republic of China officially convenes in Nanking.
 May 22 – The Soviets launch Operation Vesna, the largest Lithuanian deportation to Siberia.
 May 25 – The United Church of Christ in the Philippines (UCCP) is founded at Ellinwood Malate Church in Manila.
 May 26 – The United States Congress passes Public Law 557, which permanently establishes the Civil Air Patrol as the auxiliary of the United States Air Force.
 May 28 – Daniel François Malan defeats Jan Smuts and becomes Prime Minister of South Africa, which starts in the era of apartheid (which is finally dismantled by F. W. de Klerk in 1994).
 May 29 – The Casimir effect is predicted by Dutch physicist Hendrik Casimir.
 May 30 – A dike along the Columbia River breaks, obliterating Vanport, Oregon, within minutes; 15 people die and tens of thousands are left homeless.

June

 June 1 – Puma, a global sports goods brand, is founded in Bavaria, West Germany, by Rudolf Dassler, having split from his brother "Adi".
 June 3 – The Palomar Observatory telescope is finished in California.
 June 10 – Hasan Saka forms the new government of Turkey. (17th government; Hasan Saka had served twice as a prime minister)
 June 11 – The first monkey astronaut, Albert I, is launched into space from White Sands, New Mexico.
 June 15 – Chinese newspaper Renmin Ribao (People's Daily) is first published in Beijing, China.
 June 16 – Three armed men hijack the Cathay Pacific passenger plane Miss Macao and shoot the pilot; the plane crashes, killing 26 of 27 people on board.
 June 17 – United Airlines Flight 624, a Douglas DC-6, crashes near Mount Carmel, Pennsylvania, killing 43 and injuring 84 people on board.
 June 18  
 Malayan Emergency: A state of emergency is declared in the Federation of Malaya, due to a communist insurgency.
 LP record – Columbia Records introduces its long playing  rpm phonograph format.
 June 20 – The U.S. Congress recesses for the remainder of 1948, after an overtime session closes at 7:00 a.m.  (to be shortly interrupted by Truman's recall from Congressional recess for July 20, 1948).
 June 21
 The Deutsche Mark becomes the official currency of the future Federal Republic of Germany.
 The Manchester Baby becomes the first stored-program computer to successfully execute a program.
 June 22 
The ship  brings a large group of Afro-Caribbean immigrants to Tilbury near London, the start of a large wave of immigration to Britain.
David Lean's Oliver Twist, based on Charles Dickens's famous novel, premieres in the UK. It is banned for 3 years in the U.S., because of alleged antisemitism in depicting master criminal Fagin, played by Alec Guinness.

 June 24
 Cold War: The Berlin Blockade begins.
 The first World Health Assembly of the World Health Organization is held in Geneva.
 June 26
 William Shockley files the original patent for the grown-junction transistor, the first bipolar junction transistor.
 The Berlin Airlift begins.
 June 28
 The Cominform Resolution marks the beginning of the Informbiro period in Yugoslavia, and the Soviet/Yugoslav split. 
 The 6.8  Fukui earthquake strikes Fukui, Japan; 3,769 are killed, 22,203 injured.
 Lotte Group, a global conglomerate in Northeast Asia (South Korea and Japan), is founded.

July

 July 5 – The National Health Service in the United Kingdom begins functioning, giving the right to universal healthcare, free at point of use.
 July 6 – The world's first Air Car-ferry service is flown by a Bristol Freighter of Silver City Airways, from Lympne to Le Touquet across the English Channel.
 July 13 – The Coptic Orthodox Church of Alexandria and Ethiopian Orthodox Tewahedo Churches reach an agreement, leading to the promotion of the Ethiopian church to the rank of an autocephalous Patriarchate. Five bishops are immediately consecrated by the Patriarch of Alexandria, and the successor to Abuna Qerellos IV is granted the power to consecrate new bishops, who are empowered to elect a new Patriarch for their church.
 July 14 – The attempted assassination of Palmiro Togliatti, general secretary of the Italian Communist Party, results in numerous strikes all over the country.
 July 15 – The first London chapter of Alcoholics Anonymous is founded.
 July 20 – Cold War: 
 President Harry S. Truman issues the second peacetime military draft in the United States, amid increasing tensions with the Soviet Union (the first peacetime draft occurred in 1940 under President Roosevelt)
 Eugene Dennis, William Z. Foster, and ten other CPUSA leaders are arrested, and charged under the Alien Registration Act.
 July 22 – The Dominion of Newfoundland votes to join  Canada, after a referendum.
 July 26 – U.S. President Truman signs Executive Order 9981, ending racial segregation in the United States Armed Forces.
 July 28 – Around 200 die in explosion at a chemical plant in Ludwigshafen, Germany.
 July 29 – The 1948 Summer Olympics begin in London, the first since the 1936 Summer Olympics in Berlin.
 July 31
 At Idlewild Field in New York, New York International Airport (later renamed John F. Kennedy International Airport) is dedicated.
 Elizabeth Bentley appears under subpoena before the House Un-American Activities Committee (HUAC) of the United States House of Representatives regarding Communist espionage; she implicates Whittaker Chambers.
Claude Shannon publishes "A mathematical theory of communication" - the paper that laid the foundations for the field of "Information Theory" and all modern digital communications.

August

 August 3 – Whittaker Chambers appears under subpoena before the HUAC, and alleges that several former U.S. Federal officials were communists, including Harry Dexter White and Alger Hiss.
 August 5 – Alger Hiss appears before the HUAC, to deny the allegations of Whittaker Chambers.
 August 10–23 – The Herrenchiemsee convention prepares the draft for the Basic Law for the Federal Republic of Germany.
 August 12 – Babrra massacre: About 600 unarmed members of the Khudai Khidmatgar movement are shot dead on the orders of the Chief Minister of the North-West Frontier Province, Abdul Qayyum Khan Kashmiri, on Babrra ground in the Hashtnagar region of Charsadda District, North-West Frontier Province (modern-day Khyber Pakhtunkhwa), Pakistan.
 August 13 – Harry Dexter White and Donald Hiss refute allegations of Communism by Whittaker Chambers, before the HUAC.
 August 14 – 1948 Ashes series: Australian batsman Don Bradman, playing his last Test cricket match, against England at The Oval, is bowled by Eric Hollies for a duck; however, "The Invincibles" win the match by an innings and 149 runs, and The Ashes 4–0.
 August 15 – The southern half of Korea is established as the Republic of Korea (South Korea).
 August 17 – The HUAC holds a private session between Alger Hiss and Whittaker Chambers.
 August 18 – The Danube Commission is created by the Belgrade Convention (enters into force 11 May 1949).
 August 20 – Lee Pressman, Nathan Witt, and John Abt, represented by Harold I. Cammer, plead the Fifth Amendment, in response to allegations of Communism by Whittaker Chambers before the HUAC.
 August 23 – The World Council of Churches is established in Amsterdam, the Netherlands.
 August 24 – The first meeting of the charter members of the American Chamber of Commerce in Japan (ACCJ) is held.
 August 25 – The HUAC holds its first-ever televised congressional hearing, featuring "Confrontation Day" between Whittaker Chambers and Alger Hiss.
 August 27 – Whittaker Chambers states that Alger Hiss was a communist on Meet the Press radio.

September

 September 4 – Queen Wilhelmina of the Netherlands abdicates for health reasons.
 September 5 – Robert Schuman becomes Prime Minister of France.
 September 6 – Juliana is formally inaugurated to succeed her mother, as queen regnant of the Netherlands.
 September 9 – The northern half of Korea is formally declared the Democratic People's Republic of Korea (North Korea), with Kim Il-sung as prime minister.
 September 11 – Muhammad Ali Jinnah, founder and first Governor-General of Pakistan, dies. Pakistan is in a state of shock as it mourns the departure of the father of the nation. The day is a public holiday nationwide.
 September 13–18 – Indian annexation of Hyderabad ("Operation Polo"): The princely state of Hyderabad is invaded by the Indian Armed Forces in a "police action", in the aftermath of Pakistani leader Jinnah's death. The Nizam of Hyderabad surrenders his state, which is amalgamated into the newly independent Dominion of India; thousands are killed as a result of this event.
 September 13 – Margaret Chase Smith is elected United States Senator, and becomes the first woman to serve in both the U.S. House Of Representatives and the United States Senate.
 September 17 – Lehi members, also known as the Stern Gang, assassinate Swedish count Folke Bernadotte, United Nations Mediator in Palestine, in Jerusalem.
 September 18 – An inaugural motor race is held at Goodwood Circuit, West Sussex, England.
 September 20 – The city of Rabwah is established in Pakistan.
 September 27 – Alger Hiss files a slander suit against Whittaker Chambers, for his August 27 radio statement in the United States.
 September 29 – Laurence Olivier's film of Hamlet opens in the U.S.

October

 October 5 – The International Union for the Protection of Nature (later known as the International Union for Conservation of Nature, IUCN) is established in Fontainebleau, France.
 October 6 – 1948 Ashgabat earthquake: A 7.3  earthquake near Ashgabat, Soviet Turkmenistan kills 10,000–110,000.
 October 10 – The R-1 missile on test becomes the first Soviet launch to enter space.
 October 16 – The 57th Street Art Fair in Chicago, the oldest juried art fair in the American Midwest, is founded.
 October 20 – Brandeis University is formally founded in Massachusetts.
 October 26 – Donora Smog of 1948: A killer smog settles into Donora, Pennsylvania.
 October 29 – 1948 Arab–Israeli War: Massacres of Palestinian Arab villagers by the Israel Defense Forces:
 Al-Dawayima massacre: Between 30 and 145 are killed.
 Safsaf massacre: At least 52 are killed.
 October 30 – A luzzu fishing boat overloaded with passengers capsizes and sinks in the Gozo Channel off Qala, Gozo, Malta, killing 23 of the 27 people on board.

November

 November 1
 The Foley Square trial of Eugene Dennis and ten other CPUSA leaders begins, in New York City.
 Athenagoras I is elected the 268th Ecumenical Patriarch of Constantinople.
 A boiler and ammunition explosion aboard a merchant ship evacuating troops of the Republic of China Army from Yingkou, China for Taiwan causes thousands of deaths.
 November 2 – 1948 United States presidential election: Democratic incumbent Harry S. Truman defeats Republican Thomas E. Dewey, "Dixiecrat" Strom Thurmond, and Progressive party candidate Henry A. Wallace.
 November 12 – In Tokyo, an international war crimes tribunal sentences seven Japanese military and government officials to death, including General Hideki Tojo, for their roles in World War II.
 November 15 – Louis Stephen St. Laurent becomes Canada's 12th prime minister.
 November 16
 Operation Magic Carpet to transport Jews from Yemen to Israel begins.
 The University of the Andes (Universidad de los Andes) is founded in Bogotá, Colombia.
 November 17
 Mohammad Reza Shah Pahlavi divorces his second wife, the former Princess Fawzia of Egypt.
 Whittaker Chambers produces secret government papers, handwritten and typewritten by Alger Hiss, during pretrial examination.
 November 20 – Geoffrey B. Orbell rediscovers the Takahē, last seen 50 years previously, near Lake Te Anau, New Zealand.
 November 24 – In Venezuela, president Rómulo Gallegos is ousted by a military junta.
 November 27 – The Calgary Stampeders defeat the Ottawa Rough Riders 12–7 before 20,013 fans at Toronto's Varsity Stadium, to win their first Grey Cup, and complete the only perfect season to date in Canadian Football.

December

 December 1 – José Figueres Ferrer abolishes the army in Costa Rica, making it the first country in history to do so.
 December 2 – The United States House Un-American Activities Committee subpoenas and retrieves the "Pumpkin Papers" from the farm of Whittaker Chambers.
 December 6 – Richard Nixon displays microfilm from the "Pumpkin Papers" to the press.
 December 9 – The United Nations General Assembly adopts the Genocide Convention.
 December 10 – The United Nations General Assembly adopts the Universal Declaration of Human Rights.
 December 11–12 – Malayan Emergency: Batang Kali massacre: Scots Guards shoot 24 Chinese villagers in Malaya.
 December 15 – The United States Department of Justice indicts Alger Hiss, on two counts of perjury.
 December 17 – The Finnish Security Police is established to remove communist leadership from its predecessor, the State Police.
 December 19 – In the American National Football League, the Philadelphia Eagles defeat the Chicago Cardinals 7–0, to win the championship.
 December 20
 Indonesian National Revolution: The Dutch military captures Yogyakarta, the temporary capital of the newly formed Republic of Indonesia.
 American economist and former State Department official Laurence Duggan falls to his death, from the 16th story window of his Manhattan office.
 December 23 – Seven Japanese military and political leaders, convicted of war crimes by the International Military Tribunal for the Far East, are executed by Allied occupation authorities, at Sugamo Prison in Tokyo, Japan.
 December 26
 The last Soviet troops withdraw from North Korea.
 Cardinal József Mindszenty is arrested in Hungary, and accused of treason and conspiracy.
 December 28 – A Muslim Brotherhood member assassinates Egyptian Prime Minister Mahmud Fahmi Nokrashi.
 December 30 – The musical Kiss Me, Kate opens for the first of 1,077 performances in New York City.
 December 31 – Arab-Israeli War: Israeli troops drive Egyptians from the Negev.

Date unknown
 The Fresh Kills Landfill, the world's largest, opens on Staten Island, New York.
 The Slovak city Gúta is renamed Kolárovo.
 The Vielha Tunnel is opened, giving access to the Val d'Aran in the Spanish Pyrenees; at this time it is the longest road tunnel in the world.
 The Oakridge Transit Centre opens in Vancouver, British Columbia.
 The last recorded sighting is made of the Caspian tiger, in Kazakhstan.
 A pack of wolves kills about 40 children in Darovskoy District, in Russia.
 The last edition of the Index Librorum Prohibitorum is published in the Vatican.
 Charles Warrell creates the first I-Spy books in the United Kingdom.
 Rev. W. Awdry's third book, James the Red Engine, is published in the United Kingdom.
 Inspired by World War II fighter planes, Cadillac introduces the first automobile to sport tailfins.
 The inaugural 6 Hours of Watkins Glen sports car endurance race is held in the United States.

Births

January

 January 1 – Allan Alcorn, American engineer
 January 2
 Judith Miller, American journalist
 Joyce Wadler, American writer, memoirist
 Deborah Watling, English actress (d. 2017)
 January 3 – Wanda Seux, Paraguayan vedette, dancer, and actress (d. 2020)
 January 5
 Wally Foreman, Australian media icon (d. 2006)
 Ted Lange, African-American actor, director (The Love Boat)
 January 6 
 Guy Gardener, American astronaut
 Bob Wise, Former Governor of West Virginia
 January 7
 Kenny Loggins, American rock singer (Footloose)
 Ichirou Mizuki, Japanese voice actor
 January 10
 Remu Aaltonen, Finnish musician
 Donald Fagen, American rock keyboardist (Steely Dan)
 Teresa Graves, African-American actress and comedian (Get Christie Love) (d. 2002)
 Mischa Maisky, Latvian cellist
 January 11
 Hiroshi Wajima, Japanese sumo wrestler (d. 2018)
 Terry Goodkind, American writer (d. 2020)
 Danne Larsson, Swedish musician
 January 12
 Kenny Allen, English footballer
 Anthony Andrews, English actor
 January 13
 V. Krishnasamy, Malaysian footballer (d. 2020) 
 Françoise David, Canadian spokesperson
 January 14
 T Bone Burnett, American record producer, musician
 Muhriz of Negeri Sembilan, Yamtuan Besar of Negeri Sembilan
 Carl Weathers, African-American actor, football player (Rocky IV, Action Jackson)
 January 15 – Ronnie Van Zant, American rock musician (Lynyrd Skynyrd) (d. 1977)
 January 16
 John Carpenter, American film director, producer, screenwriter and composer
 Gregor Gysi, German politician
 Cliff Thorburn, Canadian snooker player
 Tsuneo Horiuchi, Japanese baseball pitcher, manager 
 January 17
 Billy T. James, New Zealand comedian, musician and actor (d. 1991)
 Davíð Oddsson, Prime Minister of Iceland
 January 18 – M. C. Gainey, American actor
 January 19 
 Robert Llewellyn Lyons, Canadian politician 
 January 20 
 Nancy Kress, American science fiction writer 
 Jerry L. Ross, American air engineer
 January 23
 Katharine Holabird, American writer
 Mitoji Yabunaka, Japanese politician
 January 24
 Miklós Németh, Hungarian economist and politician, Prime Minister of Hungary from 1988 until 1990
 January 27
Mikhail Baryshnikov, Russian dancer
 January 28
 Ilkka Kanerva, Finnish politician (d. 2022)
 Charles Taylor, Liberian politician, 22nd President of Liberia
 January 29 – Marc Singer, Canadian actor (V)
 January 30
 Akira Yoshino, Japanese chemist, Nobel Prize laureate
 Paul Magee, Provisional Irish Republican Army member
 January 31
 Paul Jabara, American actor, singer and songwriter (d. 1992)
 Muneo Suzuki, Japanese politician

February

 February 1 – Rick James, African-American urban singer-songwriter, multi-instrumentalist and record producer (d. 2004)
 February 2
 Ina Garten, American cooking author
 Roger Williamson, British race car driver (d. 1973)
 February 3
 Carlos Filipe Ximenes Belo, East Timorean Catholic bishop, recipient of the Nobel Peace Prize
 Henning Mankell, Swedish crime novelist (d. 2015)
 February 4
 Alice Cooper, American hard rock singer and musician (School's Out)
 Ram Baran Yadav, President of Nepal
 February 5
 Jim Dornan, Northern Irish obstetrician and gynecologist (d. 2021)
 Sven-Göran Eriksson, Swedish football manager
 Christopher Guest, American actor, screenwriter, director and composer (National Lampoon, Saturday Night Live)
 Barbara Hershey, American actress (Beaches)
 Tom Wilkinson, English actor
 February 7 – Jimmy Greenspoon, American keyboardist, composer (Three Dog Night) (d. 2015)
 February 8 – Dan Seals, American musician (d. 2009)
 February 9
 David Hayman, Scottish film, television and stage actor, director
 Greg Stafford, American game designer, publisher (d. 2018)
 February 10 
 Ûssarĸak K'ujaukitsoĸ, Greenlandic Inuit politician, human rights activist (d. 2018)
 John Magnier, Irish businessman, thoroughbred racehorse breeder
 February 11 – Chris Rush, American stand-up comedian
 February 12 – Raymond Kurzweil, American inventor, author
 February 13 – Kitten Natividad, Mexican-American film actress
 February 14
 Jackie Martling, American comedian, radio personality
 Wally Tax, Dutch musician (d. 2005)
 Raymond Teller, American illusionist and magician, one half of the duo Penn & Teller
 Yehuda Shoenfeld, Israeli physician, autoimmunity researcher
 February 15 – Larry DiTillio, American film and TV series writer (d. 2019)
 February 16 – Eckhart Tolle, German-Canadian spiritual author
 February 17
 György Cserhalmi, Hungarian actor
 José José, Mexican singer, actor (d. 2019)
 February 18 – Sinéad Cusack, Irish actress
 February 19
 Pim Fortuyn, Dutch politician, author (d. 2002)
 Tony Iommi, English heavy metal guitarist
 Elizabeth Sackler, American activist
 February 20 – Jennifer O'Neill, American model, actress
 February 21 – Christian Vander (musician), French drummer, founder of progressive rock/Zeuhl group Magma
 February 22
 John Ashton, American actor
 Leslie H. Sabo Jr., American Medal of Honor recipient (d. 1970)
 February 24
 Jayalalithaa, Indian politician, film actress (d. 2016)
 Walter Smith, Scottish football manager (d. 2021)
 February 25 – Danny Denzongpa, Indian actor
 February 28
 Steven Chu, American physicist, Nobel Prize laureate
 Mike Figgis, American director, screenwriter and composer
 Kjell Isaksson, Swedish pole vaulter
 Bernadette Peters, American actress, singer
 Mercedes Ruehl, American actress
 Alfred Sant, Leader of Malta Labour Party (1992–), Prime Minister of Malta (1996–1998)
 February 29
 Khalid Salleh, Malaysian actor, poet (d. 2018)
 Ken Foree, American actor
 Henry Small, American-born Canadian singer

March

 March 1 – Gopanarayan Das, Indian politician (d. 2022)
 March 2
 R. T. Crowley, American pioneer of electronic commerce
 Rory Gallagher, Irish musician (d. 1995)
 Jeff Kennett, Australian politician
 March 3
 Steve Wilhite, American computer scientist, developer of the GIF image format at CompuServe in 1987 (d. 2022)
 March 4
 Lindy Chamberlain-Creighton, Australian author (A Cry in the Dark)
 James Ellroy, American writer
 Tom Grieve, American baseball player
 Leron Lee, American baseball player
 Chris Squire, English bassist (Yes) (d. 2015)
 Shakin' Stevens, Welsh singer
 Brian Cummings, American voice actor
 March 5
 Eddy Grant, Guyanese British singer, musician ("Electric Avenue")
 Elaine Paige, English singer, actress
 March 6 – Anna Maria Horsford, African-American actress (Amen)
 March 8 
 Sinta Nuriyah, 4th First Lady of Indonesia, wife of Abdurrahman Wahid  
 Jonathan Sacks, British Orthodox rabbi, philosopher, theologian, author and politician (d. 2020)
 March 9
 László Lovász, Hungarian mathematician
 Jeffrey Osborne, American singer ("On the Wings of Love")
 March 10 – Doug Clark, American serial killer
 March 11
 Dominique Sanda, French actress
 March 12 – James Taylor, American singer, songwriter ("Fire and Rain")
 March 13 – Maurice A. de Gosson, Austrian mathematician
 March 14 – Billy Crystal, American actor, comedian
 March 15 – Sérgio Vieira de Mello, Brazilian diplomat (d. 2003)
 March 16 – Margaret Weis, American science fiction writer
 March 17 – William Gibson, American/Canadian writer
 March 18 
 Jessica B. Harris, American historian and journalist
 Bobby Whitlock, American singer and songwriter
 March 20
 John de Lancie, American actor
 Bobby Orr, Canadian hockey player
 Helene Vannari, Estonian actress (d. 2022)
 March 22
 Inri Cristo, Brazilian educator who claims to be Jesus Christ reincarnated
 Wolf Blitzer, American television journalist (CNN)
 Andrew Lloyd Webber, English composer (Jesus Christ Superstar)
 March 25 – Bonnie Bedelia, American actress
 March 26
 Nash the Slash (b. James Jeffrey Plewman), Canadian musician (d. 2014)
 Steven Tyler, American rock singer, songwriter (Aerosmith)
 March 28
Jayne Ann Krentz, American novelist
Dianne Wiest, American actress
 March 29 
 Mike Heideman, American basketball coach (d. 2018)
 Bud Cort, American actor (Harold and Maude)
 March 30 – Eddie Jordan, Irish founder of Jordan Grand Prix
 March 31
 Rhea Perlman, American actress (Cheers)
 Al Gore, American politician and environmentalist, 45th Vice President of the United States

April

 April 1 – Jimmy Cliff, Jamaican singer, actor
 April 2
 Bob Lienhard, American basketball player (d. 2018) 
 Roald Als, Danish cartoonist
 April 3 – Carlos Salinas de Gortari, Mexican economist, politician and 53rd President of Mexico (1988-1994)
 April 4 
 Squire Parsons, American gospel singer, songwriter
 Dan Simmons, American fantasy, science fiction author
 Berry Oakley, American musician (d. 1972)
 April 5 – Neil Portnow, American President of The Recording Academy (NARAS)
 April 7 
 Arnie Robinson, American Olympic Long jump champion (d. 2020)
 John Oates, American rock singer, guitarist (Hall & Oates)
 Pietro Anastasi, Italian football player (d. 2020)
 April 9 – Jaya Bachchan, Indian actress and politician
 April 10 – Fauzi Bowo, Indonesian politician, diplomat and former governor of Jakarta
 April 12
 Jeremy Beadle, English TV presenter (d. 2008)
 Don Fernando, American pornographic film actor, director
Joschka Fischer, German politician
 Marcello Lippi, Italian football player, manager
 April 13
 Nam Hae-il, 25th Chief of Naval Operations of the Republic of Korea Navy
 Mikhail Shufutinsky, Soviet, Russian singer, actor and TV presenter
 April 15 – Michael Kamen, American composer (d. 2003)
 April 16
 Ammar El Sherei, Egyptian music icon, celebrity (d. 2012)
 Kazuyuki Sogabe, Japanese voice actor (d. 2006)
 April 17 
 Jan Hammer, Czechoslovakian composer, pianist and keyboardist
 Peter Jenni, Swiss experimental particle physicist
 April 18 – Avi Arad, Israeli-American film producer
 April 20 – Paul Milgrom, American economist, Nobel Prize laureate
 April 21
 Paul Davis, American singer, songwriter (Cool Night) (d. 2008)
 Josef Flammer, Swiss ophthalmologist (after whom Flammer syndrome is named)
 April 24 – István Szívós, Hungarian water polo player (d. 2019)
 April 27 
 Amrit Kumar Bohara, Nepalese politician  
 Frank Abagnale, American con man, imposter
 Si Robertson, American reality star, preacher, hunter, outdoorsman, and U.S. Army veteran
 April 28
 Terry Pratchett, English comic fantasy, science fiction author (d. 2015)
 Marcia Strassman, American actress, singer (Welcome Back, Kotter) (d. 2014)
 April 29 – Michael Karoli, German musician (d. 2001)
 April 30 – Jocelyne Saab, Lebanese journalist, film director (d. 2019)

May

 May 2
 Vladimir Matorin, Russian opera singer
 Larry Gatlin, American singer, songwriter
 May 3
 William H. Miller, American maritime historian 
 Chris Mulkey, American actor
 May 4 
 Jan Kantůrek, Czech translator (d. 2018)
 Tanya Falan, American singer
 King George Tupou V of Tongo (d. 2012)
 May 5
 Joe Esposito, American singer, songwriter
 Richard Pacheco, American pornographic actor
 Bill Ward, English rock drummer
 May 7 – Susan Atkins, convicted murderer and ex-follower of Charles Manson (d. 2009)
 May 8
 Dame Felicity Lott, English soprano
 Stephen Stohn, Canadian television producer
 May 9
 Steven W. Mosher, American social scientist, author
 Calvin Murphy, American basketball player, analyst
 May 10 – Meg Foster, American actress 
 May 11
 Pam Ferris, Welsh actress 
 Shigeru Izumiya, Japanese musician
 May 12 
 Steve Winwood, English rock singer ("Higher Love")
 Lindsay Crouse, American actress
 May 13 – Hawk Wolinski, American keyboardist 
 May 14 – Bob Woolmer, Indian-born English cricket coach (d. 2007)
 May 15
 Yutaka Enatsu, Japanese professional baseball pitcher
 Brian Eno, English musician, record producer
 May 16 – Jesper Christensen, Danish actor
 May 17 – Penny DeHaven, American country singer (d. 2014)
 May 18
 Olivia Harrison, American author and film producer
 Mikko Heiniö, Finnish composer
 May 19 – Grace Jones, Jamaican singer, actress
 May 20 – Tesshō Genda, Japanese voice actor
 May 21
 D'Jamin Bartlett, American musical theatre actress
 Elizabeth Buchan, English writer
 Jonathan Hyde, Australian-born English actor
 Carol Potter, American actress
 Leo Sayer, English rock musician ("When I Need You")
 May 23 – Gary McCord, American professional golfer
 May 25 – Klaus Meine, German singer (Scorpions)
 May 26
 Dayle Haddon, Canadian model, actress
 Stevie Nicks, American rock singer, songwriter (Fleetwood Mac)
 May 27 – Wubbo de Boer, Dutch civil servant
 May 29 – Michael Berkeley, English composer
 May 30 – Paul L. Schechter, American astronomer and cosmologist 
 May 31
 Svetlana Alexievich, Belarusian writer of literary reportage, Nobel Prize laureate
 Lynda Bellingham, English actress, broadcaster and author (d. 2014)
 John Bonham, English rock drummer (Led Zeppelin) (d. 1980)

June

 June 1
 Powers Boothe, American actor (Guyana Tragedy: The Story of Jim Jones) (d. 2017)
 Tom Sneva, American race car driver, Indianapolis 500 winner
 June 2 – Jerry Mathers, American actor (Leave It to Beaver)
 June 3 – Carlos Franzetti, Argentine composer and arranger
 June 4
 Bob Champion, English jump jockey
 David Haskell,  American actor (d. 2000)
 June 6 – Richard Sinclair, English musician (Caravan)
 June 7 – Jim C. Walton, American business person, (′′Walmart′′)
 June 8
 Jürgen von der Lippe, German television presenter, actor and comedian
 Jad Azkoul, Lebanese-American classical guitarist
 June 9 
 Gudrun Schyman, Swedish politician
 Gary Thorne, American play-by-play announcer
 June 10 – Subrata Roy, Indian businessman
 June 11 – Dave Cash, American baseball player
 June 12 – Sadegh Zibakalam, Iranian academic reformist
 June 13 – Garnet Bailey, Canadian hockey player, scout (d. 2001)
 June 14 – Laurence Yep, American author
 June 15 – Paul Michiels, Belgian singer, songwriter
 June 16 – Terry Schofield, American basketball player
 June 17 – Dave Concepción, Venezuelan baseball player
 June 18 – Sherry Turkle, American science/social studies professor 
 Eliezer Halfin, Israeli wrestler (d. 1972) 
 June 19
 Nick Drake, English musician (d. 1974)
 Lea Laven, Finnish singer
 Phylicia Rashad, African-American actress (The Cosby Show)
 June 20
 Diana Mara Henry, American freelance photojournalist
 Alan Longmuir, Scottish musician (d. 2018) 
 Ludwig Scotty, President of Nauru
 Tina Sinatra, American former singer, actress, film producer, and memoirist
 June 21
 Lionel Rose, Australian boxer (d. 2011)
 Jovan Aćimović, Serbian football player
 Raffaello Martinelli, Italian prelate
 Philippe Sarde, French film composer
 Andrzej Sapkowski, Polish writer
 Wolfgang Seel, German football player
 Greg Hyder, American professional basketball player
 June 22 
 Madeleine Meilleur, Canadian politician
 Takashi Sasano, Japanese actor
 Shōhaku Okumura, Japanese Soto Zen
 Peter Prijdekker, Dutch swimmer
 Sue Roberts, American professional golfer
 Todd Rundgren, American rock singer, record producer (Hello It's Me)
 Curtis Johnson, American football cornerback 
 Franciszek Smuda, Polish football coach
 Panagiotis Xanthakos, Greek sports shoote
 Colin Waldron, English football defender
 June 23
 Larry Coker, American football player, coach
 Jim Heacock, American defensive coordinator
 Luther Kent, American blues singer
 June 24
 Stephen Martin, Australian politician, senior academic and rugby league referee
 Patrick Moraz, Swiss keyboard player
 Janet Museveni, First Lady of Uganda
 Dave Orchard, South African cricketer
 Eigil Sørensen, Danish cyclist
 Jürgen Stars, German footballer
 Jenny Wood, Zimbabwean swimmer
 June 25
 Kenn George, American businessman
 Michael Lembeck, American actor, television and film director
 Tom Rideout, Canadian politician
 June 26
 David Vaughan, Welsh professional golfer
 John Pratt, English professional footballer
 Pablo Anaya Rivera, Mexican politician
 June 27 
 Vennira Aadai Nirmala, Tamil actress
 Michael J. Barrett, Guamanian politician
 Camile Baudoin, American rock guitarist
 June 28 
 Deborah Moggach, English writer
 Kathy Bates, American actress (Misery)
 Jimmy Thomson, Scottish professional footballer 
 Brian Rowan, Scottish professional footballer
 June 29
 Danny Adcock, Australian actor
 Vic Brooks, English cricketer
 Leo Burke, Canadian professional wrestler
 Fred Grandy, American actor, politician (The Love Boat)
 Helge Karlsen, Norwegian football player
 Ian Paice, English musician (Deep Purple)
 Usha Prashar, Baroness Prashar, crossbench member of the House of Lords
 June 30 
 Alice Wong, Canadian politician
 Dag Fornæss, Norwegian speed skater
 Peter Rossborough, English rugby union international
 Galarrwuy Yunupingu, Australian Indigenous community leader
 Vladimir Yakunin, Russian official, head of state-run Russian Railways Company
 Raymond Leo Burke, American cardinal, prelate

July
 

 

 

 July 1 
 Ever Hugo Almeida, Paraguayan footballer
 John Ford, English-born rock musician (Strawbs), writer of Part of the Union
 Michael McGimpsey, Northern Ireland politician
 July 2 
 Mario Villanueva, Mexican politician
 Saul Rubinek, German-Canadian character actor, director, producer and playwright
 July 3 – Tarmo Koivisto, Finnish comics artist
 July 4 
 René Arnoux, French racing driver
 Louis Raphaël I Sako, Head of the Chaldean Catholic Church
 Ed Armbrister, Bahamian Major League Baseball outfielder
 Nazmul Hussain, Indian first-class cricketer
 Jeremy Spencer, British musician
 July 5
 Tony DeMeo, American football coach, player
 Dave Lemonds, American baseball player
 Salomon Juan Marcos Issa, Mexican politician
 Lojze Peterle, Slovenian politician
 William Hootkins, American actor (d. 2005)
 July 6
 Nathalie Baye, French actress
 Jeff Webb, American professional basketball player
 Arnaldo Baptista, Brazilian rock musician, composer
 Brad Park, Canadian NHL Defenseman 
 Sid Smith, American football offensive lineman
 Eiko Segawa, Japanese female enka singer, actress
 Jan van der Veen, Dutch professional association football player
 July 7
 Jerry Sherk, American football defensive tackle
 Jean LeClerc, Québécois actor
 Jean-Marie Colombani, French journalist
 Tan Lee Meng, Singaporean jurist
 Stuart Varney, British-American economic consultant
 Luis Estrada, Mexican football league forward, Olympic athlete
 July 8 – Raffi, Egyptian-born children's entertainer
 July 10
 Theo Bücker, German football manager, player
 Mick Coop, English professional football right back
 Rich Hand, American professional baseball player
 July 12 
 Richard Simmons, American television personality, fitness expert
 Jay Thomas, American actor (d. 2017)
 July 13
 Alf Hansen, Norwegian rower
 Daphne Maxwell Reid, African-American actress
 Don Sweet, Canadian star football kicker
 Robert A. Underwood, Guamanian politician, educator
 July 14 – Goodwill Zwelithini kaBhekuzulu, Zulu king (d. 2021)
 July 15
 Enriqueta Basilio, Mexican track and field athlete (d.2019)
 Richard Franklin, Australian film director (d. 2007)
 Twinkle, English singer, songwriter (d. 2015)
 July 16
 Rubén Blades, Panamanian singer, actor and musician
 Rita Barberá, Spanish politician, Mayor of Valencia (d. 2016)
 Lars Lagerbäck, Swedish football manager, player
 Jeff Van Wagenen, American professional golfer
 Pinchas Zukerman, Israeli violinist
 July 17 
 Doug Berry, American Canadian football coach
 Alan Sieler, Australian cricketer
 July 18 – Hartmut Michel, German chemist, Nobel Prize laureate
 July 20
 Muse Watson, American actor
 Maroun Elias Nimeh Lahham, Archbishop of the Roman Catholic Archdiocese of Tunis
 July 21
 Beppe Grillo, Italian activist, blogger, comedian and actor
 Ed Hinton, American sportswriter
 Cat Stevens (b. Steven Georgiou, later known as Yusuf Islam), British singer, musician 
 Garry Trudeau, American cartoonist (Doonesbury)
 Teruzane Utada, Japanese music executive producer, attendant
 Mikhail Zadornov, Russian stand-up comedian, writer
 Snooty, male Florida manatee (d. 2017)
 July 22 
 Susan Eloise Hinton, American author
 Otto Waalkes, German comedian, actor
 July 23 – John Cushnahan, Northern Irish politician
 July 25 
 Steve Goodman, American Grammy Award-winning folk music singer, songwriter (d. 1984)
 Tony Cline, American football player (d. 2018)
 July 27 – Peggy Fleming, American figure skater
 July 28
 Gerald Casale, American director, singer (Devo)\
 Georgia Engel, American actress (d. 2019)
 Sally Struthers, American actress, spokeswoman (All in the Family)
 July 30
 Jean Reno, French actor
 Julia Tsenova, Bulgarian composer, musician (d. 2010)
 July 31 – Jonathan Dollimore, English academic sociologist, cultural theorist

August

 August 2
 Dennis Prager, American radio talk show host, author
 Bob Rae, Canadian politician
 August 3 – Jean-Pierre Raffarin, Prime Minister of France
 August 4 – Giorgio Parisi, Italian theoretical physicist and Nobel Prize laureate 
 August 7 – James P. Allison, American immunologist, recipient of the Nobel Prize in Physiology or Medicine
 August 8 – Wincey Willis, British broadcaster
 August 12 – Mizengo Pinda, 9th Prime Minister of Tanzania
 August 13 – Kathleen Battle, African-American soprano
 August 14 – Joseph Marcell, English actor
 August 15 
 Mahmoud Hashemi Shahroudi, Iranian cleric, politician (d. 2018)
 George Ryton, Singapore-born English Formula One engineer
 August 18 – Sean Scanlan, Scottish actor (d. 2017) 
 Robert Hughes, Australian actor
 Deana Martin, American singer and actress
 August 20
 John Noble, Australian actor
 Robert Plant, English singer (Led Zeppelin)
 Barbara Allen Rainey (b. Barbara Ann Allen), American aviator, first female pilot in the U.S. armed forces (d. 1982)
 August 21
 Sharon M. Draper, American children's book author (Out of My Mind (Draper novel))
 Peter Starkie, Australian rock guitarist (Skyhooks, Jo Jo Zep & The Falcons)
 August 22 – David Marks, American guitarist (The Beach Boys)
 August 23 – Lev Zeleny, Soviet, Russian physicist
 August 24
 Jean-Michel Jarre, French electronic musician
 Sauli Niinistö, Finnish politician, 12th President of Finland
 Kim Sung-il, Chief of Staff of the Republic of Korea Air Force 
 Vicente Sotto III, Filipino actor, host and politician
 August 25 – Tony Ramos, Brazilian actor
 August 27 – Sgt. Slaughter, American professional wrestler
 August 30 
 Lewis Black, American comedian
 Fred Hampton, American activist (d. 1969)
 Victor Skumin, Russian scientist, professor
 August 31
 Cyril Jordan, American musician
 Holger Osieck, German football manager

September

 September 1 – James Rebhorn, American actor (d. 2014)
 September 2
 Nate Archibald, American basketball player
 Terry Bradshaw, American football player, sportscaster
 Christa McAuliffe, American teacher and astronaut (d. in Space Shuttle Challenger disaster 1986)
 September 3
 Don Brewer, American drummer (Grand Funk Railroad)
 Levy Mwanawasa, Zambian president (d. 2008)
 September 4 – Michael Berryman, American actor
 September 5 – Benita Ferrero-Waldner, Austrian diplomat, politician
 September 6 – Sam Hui, Hong Kong singer
 September 7 
 Susan Blakely, American actress
 Khalifa bin Zayed Al Nahyan, ruler of Abu Dhabi (d. 2022)
 September 8 – The Great Kabuki, Japanese professional wrestler
 September 10
 Judy Geeson, English actress
 Bob Lanier, American basketball player (d. 2022)
 Margaret Trudeau (b. Margaret Sinclair), wife and mother of Prime Ministers of Canada
 Charlie Waters, American football player
 September 11 – John Martyn (b. Iain McGeachy), British folk-rock guitarist (d. 2009)
 September 12 – Mah Bow Tan, Singaporean politician
 September 13
 Nell Carter, African-American singer, actress (Gimme a Break!) (d. 2003)
 Sitiveni Rabuka, 3rd Prime Minister of Fiji 
 Kathleen Lloyd, American actress
 September 16 – Ron Blair, American rock bassist (Tom Petty and the Heartbreakers)
 September 17
 Aidan Nichols, English Dominican priest and academic
 John Ritter, American actor (Three's Company) (d. 2003)
 September 19
 Jeremy Irons, English actor
 Nadiya Tkachenko, Soviet pentathlete
 September 20
 Rey Langit, Filipino journalist, radio host
 George R. R. Martin, American speculative fiction author
 September 22
 Denis Burke, Australian politician
 Jim Byrnes, American voice actor, blues musician and actor
 Mark Phillips, British army captain, equestrian and first husband of Anne, Princess Royal
 September 23 – José Lavat, Mexican voice actor (d. 2018)
 September 24 – Phil Hartman, Canadian actor, comedian (Saturday Night Live) (d. 1998)
 September 25
 Cäcilia Rentmeister, German art historian, gender researcher
 Vasile Șirli, Romanian musical composer and producer
 Vladimir Yevtushenkov, Russian oligarch
 September 26
 Maurizio Gucci, Italian businessman, murder victim (d. 1995)
 Olivia Newton-John, English-born Australian singer, actress (d. 2022)
 Vladimír Remek, Czech politician and cosmonaut
 September 27 
 Michele Dotrice, English actress
 A Martinez, American actor, singer
 September 29
 Mark Farner, American rock guitarist, singer (Grand Funk Railroad)
 Bryant Gumbel, African-American television broadcaster (The Today Show)
 Theo Jörgensmann, German jazz clarinetist
 Burton Richardson, American game show announcer

October

 October 1 
 Mark Landon, American actor (d. 2009)
 Sir Peter Blake, New Zealand yachtsman (k. 2001)
 October 2
 Avery Brooks, American actor, musician
 Persis Khambatta, Indian actress, model (Star Trek: The Motion Picture) (d. 1998)
 Chris LeDoux, American singer, rodeo star (d. 2005)
 Donna Karan, American fashion designer
 October 4 
 Meg Bennett, American soap opera writer
 Iain Hewitson, New Zealand-Australian chef, restaurateur, author, and television personality 
October 5 – Russell Mael, American singer (Sparks)
October 6
 Wendell Ladner, American basketball player (d. 1975)
 Gerry Adams, Northern Irish politician
 October 7 – Diane Ackerman, American poet, essayist
 October 8
 Johnny Ramone, American guitarist (Ramones) (d. 2004)
 Baldwin Spencer, 3rd Prime Minister of Antigua and Barbuda
 October 9
 Jackson Browne, American rock musician ("Running on Empty")
 Ciarán Carson, Northern Irish poet, novelist
 Oliver Hart, English-born economist, Nobel Prize laureate
 October 11
 Margie Alexander, American gospel, soul singer (d. 2013)
 Cynthia Clawson, American gospel singer
 October 12 – Rick Parfitt, English musician (Status Quo) (d. 2016)
 October 13
 John Ford Coley, American rock musician ("I'd Really Love to See You Tonight")
 Nusrat Fateh Ali Khan, Pakistani musician (d. 1997)
 October 14
 Engin Arık, Turkish nuclear physicist (d. 2007)
 David Ruprecht, American actor, writer (Supermarket Sweep)
 October 15
 Renato Corona, Filipino jurist, lawyer (d. 2016)
 Chris de Burgh, born Christopher Davison, Argentine-born Anglo-Irish singer, songwriter
 October 16
 Leo Mazzone, American baseball coach
 Hema Malini, Indian actress, writer, director, producer, dancer and politician
 October 17
 Robert Jordan, American novelist (d. 2007)
 Margot Kidder, Canadian actress (Superman) (d. 2018)
 Akira Kushida, Japanese singer 
 Ng Jui Ping, Singaporean entrepreneur and former army general (d. 2020)
 George Wendt, American actor (Cheers)
 October 18 
 Hans Köchler, Austrian philosopher
 Ntozake Shange, African-American playwright and poet (d. 2018)
 October 19 – Patrick Simmons, American musician (The Doobie Brothers)
 October 21
 Tom Everett, American actor
 Allen Vigneron, Roman Catholic Archbishop of Detroit
 October 22 
 Lynette Fromme, American attempted assassin of Gerald Ford
 Debbie Macomber, American author
 October 23 – Sir Gerry Robinson, Irish-born British businessman (d. 2021)
 October 25
 Dave Cowens, American basketball player, coach
 Dan Gable, American wrestler, coach
 Dan Issel, American basketball player and coach
 October 26 – Toby Harrah, American baseball player
 October 28 – Telma Hopkins, African-American actress, singer (Tony Orlando and Dawn)
 October 29
 Giuseppe Chirichiello, Italian economist and university professor
 Kate Jackson, American actress (Charlie's Angels)
 October 30 – Garry McDonald, Australian actor, satirist, and comedian

November

 November 1 – Anna Stuart, American actress
 November 3 – Lulu (b. Marie McDonald McLaughlin Lawrie), Scottish singer, actress (To Sir, with Love)
 November 4
 Delia Casanova, Mexican actress
 Amadou Toumani Touré, 3rd President of Mali (d. 2020)
 November 5
 Charles Bradley, African-American singer (d. 2017)
 Bob Barr, American politician
 Dallas Holm, American Christian musician 
 Zacharias Jimenez, Filipino Roman Catholic bishop (d. 2018)
 Khalid Ibrahim Khan, Pakistani politician (d. 2018)
 William Daniel Phillips, American physicist, Nobel Prize laureate
 November 6 – Glenn Frey, American guitarist, singer (Eagles) (d. 2016)
 November 7 – Jim Houghton, American actor, director
 November 9
 Viktor Matviyenko, Ukrainian footballer, coach (d. 2018)
 Luiz Felipe Scolari, Brazilian football player, manager
 Kelly Harmon, American actress and model
 November 10 – Vincent Schiavelli, American character actor and food writer (d. 2005)
 November 12
 Skip Campbell, American politician (d. 2018)
 Hassan Rouhani, 7th President of Iran
 Richard Roberts, American evangelist, son of Oral Roberts
 November 13
 Humayun Ahmed, Bengali-language writer
 Lockwood Smith, New Zealand politician
 November 14
 King Charles III of the United Kingdom
 Robert Ginty, American actor, producer, screenwriter and director (d. 2009)
 Dee Wallace, American actress
 November 15 – James Kemsley, Australian cartoonist, actor (d. 2007)
 November 16
 Chi Coltrane, American musician (Thunder and Lightning)
 Ken James, Australian actor 
 Mutt Lange, Rhodesian-born record producer
 Mate Parlov, Yugoslav Olympic boxer (d. 2008)
 November 18 – Dom Irrera, American actor and stand-up comedian 
 November 19 – Rance Allen, African-American gospel singer, preacher
 November 20
 Harlee McBride, American actress
 John R. Bolton, U.S. Ambassador to the U.N., National Security Advisor
 Barbara Hendricks, American singer 
 Richard Masur, American actor, director and president of the Screen Actors Guild
 November 21
 Alphonse Mouzon, American jazz drummer (d. 2016)
 Michel Suleiman, President of Lebanon
 November 22 – Saroj Khan, Indian dance choreographer (d. 2020)
 November 23
 Dominique-France Picard (aka Princess Fadila of Egypt), wife of King Fuad II of Egypt and the Sudan
 Ron Bouchard, American NASCAR driver (d. 2015)
 Gabriele Seyfert, East German figure skater
Bonfoh Abass, Togolese politician and President of Togo (d. 2021)
 November 24 – Joe Howard, American actor
 November 25 – Antoine Sfeir, Franco-Lebanese journalist, professor (d. 2018)
 November 26
 Elizabeth Blackburn, Australian-American biologist,  winner of Nobel Prize in Physiology or Medicine  
 Gayle McCormick, American singer (Smith) (d. 2016)
 Marianne Muellerleile, American actress
 November 28 – Agnieszka Holland, Polish film, television director and screenwriter

December

 December 2
 T. Coraghessan Boyle, American writer
 Rajat Gupta, Indian-American businessman
 Patricia Hewitt, British Labour Party politician
 Toninho Horta, Brazilian singer, musician
 Christine Westermann, German television, radio host, journalist and author
 December 3
 Rick Cua, American singer, evangelist
 Ozzy Osbourne, English singer (Black Sabbath)
 December 5,
 Saburō Shinoda, Japanese actor (Ultraman Taro)
 December 6
 Keke Rosberg, Finnish Formula One champion
 Marius Müller-Westernhagen, German actor, musician
 JoBeth Williams, American actress, director
 Yoshihide Suga, Prime Minister of Japan 
 December 7
 Gary Morris, American country singer, actor
 Tony Thomas, American television and film producer
 Mads Vinding, Danish bassist
 December 10 – Abu Abbas, Palestine Liberation Front founder (d. 2004)
 December 11 – Chester Thompson, American rock drummer
 December 12 – Marcelo Rebelo de Sousa, 20th President of Portugal
 December 13
 Lillian Board, South African-born English Olympic athlete (d. 1970)
 Ted Nugent, American rock guitarist, singer, conservative political commentator (Cat Scratch Fever)
 David O'List, English rock guitarist
 December 14
 Lester Bangs, American music journalist (d. 1982)
 Dee Wallace, American actress 
 December 15
Melanie Chartoff, American actress and singer (Rugrats)
Charlie Scott, American basketball player
 December 18 – Edmund Kemper, American serial killer
 December 19 – Ken Brown, Canadian ice hockey player
 December 20
 Orchidea De Santis, Italian actress
 Abdulrazak Gurnah, Zanzibar-born novelist, Nobel Prize laureate
 Alan Parsons, English songwriter, musician and record producer
 December 21
 Samuel L. Jackson, American actor, film producer
 Willi Resetarits, Austrian musician, cabaret artist
 December 22
 Noel Edmonds, English TV presenter, DJ
 Steve Garvey, American baseball player
 Flip Mark, American child actor
 Lynne Thigpen, American actress (Godspell) (d. 2003)
 December 23 – Jim Ferguson, American guitarist, composer, educator, author and music journalist
 December 25
 Alia Al-Hussein, queen consort of Jordan (d. 1977)
 Barbara Mandrell, American country singer, musician and actress
 December 27
Ronnie Caldwell, American soul music, rhythm and blues musician (d. 1967)
Gérard Depardieu, French actor
 December 28 – Mary Weiss, American singer (The Shangri-Las)
 December 29 – Peter Robinson, Northern Ireland First Minister
 December 31
 Stephen Cleobury, English choral conductor (d. 2019)
 Joe Dallesandro, American model, actor
 Sandy Jardine, Scottish professional footballer, playing for Rangers and Hearts and representing Scotland (d. 2014)
 Donna Summer, African-American singer, actress (Love to Love You Baby) (d. 2012)

Deaths

January

 January 1 – Edna May, American actress (b. 1878)
 January 2 – Vicente Huidobro, Chilean poet (b. 1893)
 January 4 – Anna Kallina, Austrian actress (b. 1874)
 January 5 – Mary Dimmick Harrison, wife of President Benjamin Harrison (b. 1858)
 January 7 
 Charles C. Wilson, American actor (b. 1894)
 Maria de Maeztu Whitney, Spanish educator, feminist (b. 1882)
 January 8 
 Charles Magnusson, Swedish producer, screenwriter (b. 1878)
 Kurt Schwitters, German artist (b. 1887)
 Edward Stanley Kellogg, 16th Governor of American Samoa (b. 1870)
 January 12 – Herbert Allen Farmer, American criminal (b. 1891)
 January 19 – Tony Garnier, French architect (b. 1869)
 January 21 
 Eliza Moore, last person born into slavery in the United States (b. 1843)
Naomasa Sakonju, Japanese admiral and war criminal (executed) (b. 1890)
 Ermanno Wolf-Ferrari, Italian composer (b. 1876)
 January 24 
 Bill Cody, American actor (b. 1891)
 Maria Mandl, Austrian concentration camp guard and war criminal (executed) (b. 1912)
 January 26 – Georg Bruchmüller, German artillery officer (b. 1863)
 January 28
 Therese Brandl, German concentration camp guard and war criminal (executed) (b. 1902)
 Anna Maria Gove, American physician (b. 1867)
 January 29 – King Tomislav II of Croatia (b. 1900)
 January 30
 Sir Arthur Coningham, British air force air marshal (disappeared) (b. 1895)
 Mahatma Gandhi, Leader of Indian independence movement, (assassinated) (b. 1869)
 Orville Wright, American co-inventor of the airplane (b. 1871)

February

 February 2
 Thomas W. Lamont, American banker (b. 1870)  
 Bevil Rudd, South African athlete (b. 1894)
 February 4 – Otto Praeger, American postal official, implemented U.S. Airmail (b. 1871)
 February 5 – Johannes Blaskowitz, German general (b. 1883)
 February 8 – Samuel P. Bush, American businessman, industrialist (b. 1863)
 February 9 – Karl Valentin, German actor (b. 1882)
 February 11 
 Sergei Eisenstein, Soviet film director (b. 1898)
 Sir Isaac Isaacs, 9th Governor-General of Australia (b. 1855)
 February 15 – Subhadra Kumari Chauhan, Indian poet (b. 1904)
 February 23 – John Robert Gregg, Irish-born inventor of shorthand (b. 1867)
 February 25 
 Alfredo Baldomir, Uruguayan politician, soldier, architect, 27th President of Uruguay and World War II leader (b. 1884)
 Alexander du Toit, South African geologist (b. 1878)
 Juan Esteban Montero, Chilean political figure, 20th President of Chile (b. 1879)
 February 27 – Patriarch Nicodim of Romania (b. 1864).

March

 March 4 – Antonin Artaud, French playwright, actor and director (b. 1896) 
 March 10
 Zelda Fitzgerald, American wife of F. Scott Fitzgerald (b. 1900)
 Jan Masaryk, Czechoslovakian Foreign Minister (b. 1886)
 March 16 – León S. Morra, Argentine physician and university professor (b. 1882)
 March 23 – George Milne, 1st Baron Milne, British field marshal (b. 1866)
 March 24 
 Nikolai Berdyaev, Soviet religious leader, political philosopher (b. 1874)
 Paolo Thaon di Revel, former admiral of the Royal Italian Navy (b. 1859)
 March 31 – Egon Erwin Kisch, Austrian journalist, author (b. 1885)

April

 April 2
 Biagio Biagetti, Italian painter (b. 1877)
 Baba Sawan Singh, Indian saint known as "The Great Master" (b. 1858)
 April 5 – Angelo Joseph Rossi, American political figure, Mayor of San Francisco (b. 1878)
 April 7 – Isabel Andreu de Aguilar, Puerto Rican writer, educator, philanthropist and activist (b. 1887)
 April 8 – Abd al-Qadir al-Husayni, Palestinian Arab nationalist (b. 1907)
 April 9 – Jorge Eliécer Gaitán, Colombian politician (assassinated) (b. 1903)
 April 14 – W. H. Ellis, American attorney and politician (b. 1867)
 April 15 – Manuel Roxas, Filipino statesman, 5th President of the Philippines (b. 1892)
 April 17 – Kantarō Suzuki, Japanese admiral, 42nd Prime Minister of Japan (b. 1868)
 April 19 – Mikhail Rostovtsev, Soviet actor (b. 1872)
 April 20 – Mitsumasa Yonai, Japanese admiral and politician, 37th Prime Minister of Japan (b. 1880)
 April 21 – Carlos López Buchardo, Argentine composer (b. 1881)
 April 22 – Prosper Montagné, French chef and author (b. 1865)
 April 24 – Manuel Ponce, Mexican composer (b. 1882)
 April 25 – Gerardo Matos Rodriguez, Uruguayan composer, journalist and pianist (b. 1897)
 April 30 – Alfredo Miguel Aguayo Sánchez, Puerto Rican educator, writer (b. 1866)

May

 May 9 – Viola Allen, American actress (b. 1867)
 May 13
 Milan Begović, Yugoslavian writer (b. 1876)
 Kathleen Cavendish, Marchioness of Hartington (b. 1920)
 May 15 
 André Dauchez, French painter (b. 1870)
 Father Edward J. Flanagan, Irish-born American Roman Catholic priest, founder of Boys Town and monsignor (b. 1886)
 Toyoaki Horiuchi, Japanese general, Class B war criminal suspect (executed) (b. 1900)
 May 16 – Muhammad Habibullah, Indian politician (b. 1869)
 May 18 – Francisco Alonso, Spanish composer (b. 1887)
 May 19 – Maximilian Lenz, Austrian painter and sculptor (b. 1860)
 May 21 – Jacques Feyder, French filmmaker (b. 1885)
 May 22 – Claude McKay, Jamaican-born American writer and poet (b. 1889)
 May 25 – Witold Pilecki, Polish resistance leader (executed) (b. 1901)
 May 26 – Émile Gaston Chassinat, French egyptologist (b. 1868)
 May 28 – Unity Mitford, British socialite; friend of Adolf Hitler (b. 1914)
 May 29 – Dame May Whitty, British actress (b. 1865)
 May 30 – József Klekl, Slovene politician in Hungary (b. 1874)

June

 June 1 – José Vianna da Motta, Portuguese pianist, teacher and composer (b. 1868)
 June 2
 Viktor Brack, German doctor (executed) (b. 1904) 
 Karl Brandt, German S.S. officer (executed) (b. 1904)
 Rudolf Brandt, German S.S. officer (executed) (b. 1909)
 Karl Gebhardt, German S.S. officer (executed) (b. 1897)
 Waldemar Hoven, German S.S. officer (executed) (b. 1903)
 Joachim Mrugowsky, German S.S. officer (executed) (b. 1905)
 Wolfram Sievers, German S.S. officer (executed) (b. 1905)
 June 6 – Louis Lumière, French film pioneer (b. 1864)
 June 8 – Giacomo Albanese, Italian mathematician (b. 1890)
 June 13 – Osamu Dazai, Japanese writer (b. 1909)
 June 16 – Eugênia Álvaro Moreyra, Brazilian journalist, actress and director (b. 1898)
 June 25 – Bento de Jesus Caraça, Portuguese mathematician, economist and statistician (b. 1901)
 June 26
 Nasib al-Bitar, Palestine jurist (b. 1890)
 Lilian Velez, Filipino actress (murdered) (b. 1924)
 June 30 – Prince Sabahaddin (b. 1879)

July

 July 1 – Assunta Marchetti, Italian Roman Catholic religious professed and blessed
 July 4 
 Albert Bates, American criminal (b. 1893)
 Monteiro Lobato, Brazilian writer (b. 1882)
 July 5
 Georges Bernanos, French writer (b. 1888)
 Charles Fillmore, American Protestant mystic (b. 1854)
 Carole Landis, American actress (b. 1919)
 July 9 – Alcibiades Diamandi, Greek political figure (b. 1893)
 July 11
 King Baggot, American actor (b. 1879)
 Franz Weidenreich, German anatomist, physical anthropologist (b. 1873)
 July 14 
 Harry Brearley, British inventor of stainless steel (b. 1871)
 Marguerite Moreno, French actress (b. 1871)
 July 15 – John J. Pershing, American general (b. 1860)
 July 17 – Ildebrando Zacchini, Maltese painter, inventor and traveller (b. 1868)
 July 18 – Baldassarre Negroni, Italian director, screenwriter (b. 1877)
 July 21 – Arshile Gorky, Soviet-born painter (b. 1904)
 July 22 – Sud Mennucci, Brazilian journalist, educator (b. 1882)
 July 23 – D. W. Griffith, American film director (The Birth of a Nation) (b. 1875)
 July 24 – Pencho Zlatev, Bulgarian general, 25th Prime Minister of Bulgaria (b. 1881)
 July 26 – Antonin Sertillanges, French Catholic philosopher, spiritual writer (b. 1863)
 July 27 – Joe Tinker, American baseball player (Chicago Cubs), MLB Hall of Fame member (b. 1880)
 July 28 – Susan Glaspell, American playwright (b. 1876)
 July 31 – Lucy Mercer Rutherfurd, mistress of President Franklin Delano Roosevelt (b. 1891)

August

 August 3 – Tommy Ryan, American boxing champion (b. 1870)
 August 4 – Mileva Marić, Serbian physicist and mathematician, wife of Albert Einstein (b. 1875)
 August 7 – Charles Bryant, American actor (b. 1879)
 August 10 – Andrew Brown, Scottish soccer coach (b. 1870)
 August 11 – Kan'ichi Asakawa, Japanese historian (b. 1873)
 August 13 – Edwin Maxwell, Irish actor (b. 1886)
 August 16 – Babe Ruth, American baseball player (New York Yankees), MLB Hall of Fame member (b. 1895)
 August 26 – George Anderson, American actor (b. 1886)
 August 27 
 Cissie Cahalan, Irish trade union, feminist and suffragette (b. 1876)
 Charles Evans Hughes, 11th Chief Justice of the United States, 1916 Republican presidential candidate (b. 1862)

September

 September 1 
 Feng Yuxiang, Chinese warlord and general (b. 1882)
 Moncef Bey, ruler of Tunisia (1942–43) (b. 1881)
 September 2 – Sylvanus Morley, American scholar, World War I spy (b. 1883)
 September 3 – Edvard Beneš, Czechoslovakian politician, 4th Prime Minister of Czechoslovakia and 2-time President of Czechoslovakia (b. 1884)
 September 5 – Richard C. Tolman, American mathematical physicist (b. 1881)
 September 7 – André Suarès, French poet, critic (b. 1868)
 September 10 – Tsar Ferdinand I of Bulgaria (b. 1861)
 September 11 – Muhammad Ali Jinnah, founder, first Governor General of Pakistan (b. 1876)
 September 12
 Rupert D'Oyly Carte, British hotelier, theatre owner and impresario (b. 1876)
 Carlo Servolini, Italian artist (b. 1876)
 September 13 – Paul Wegener, German actor, film director, and screenwriter; one of the pioneers of German Expressionism  (b. 1874)
 September 17 
 Ruth Benedict, American anthropologist, folklorist (b. 1887)
 Folke Bernadotte, Swedish diplomat (assassinated) (b. 1895)
 Emil Ludwig, German-born Swiss historian, biographer (b. 1881)
 Raffaele Rossi, Italian Roman Catholic cardinal, eminence and servant of God (b. 1876)
 September 20 – Husain Salaahuddin, Maldivian writer (b. 1881)
 September 22 – Prince Adalbert of Prussia (b. 1884)
 September 24 – Warren William, American actor (b. 1894)
 September 26 – Gregg Toland, American cinematographer (b. 1904)
 September 27 – Frank Cellier, British actor (b. 1884)
 September 30 
 Vasily Kachalov, Soviet actor (b. 1875)
 Edith Roosevelt, First Lady of the United States (b. 1861)

October

 October 1 
 Francisco Rodrigues da Cruz, Portuguese priest (b. 1859)
 Phraya Manopakorn Nititada, 1st Prime Minister of Siam (b. 1884)
 October 12 – Susan Sutherland Isaacs, English educational psychologist and psychoanalyst (b. 1885)
 October 13 – Samuel S. Hinds, American actor (b. 1875)
 October 14 – Dale Fuller, American actress (b. 1885)
 October 15 – Edythe Chapman, American actress (b. 1863)
 October 18 – Walther von Brauchitsch, German field marshal (b. 1881)
 October 21 – Elissa Landi, Italian actress (b. 1904)
 October 24 – Franz Lehár, Hungarian composer (b. 1870)
 October 31 – Mary Nolan, American actress (b. 1902)

November

 November 4 
 Albert Stanley, 1st Baron Ashfield, British-born American businessman (b. 1874)
 Filippo Perlo, Italian Roman Catholic prelate and missionary (b. 1873)
 November 7 – David Leland, American actor (b. 1932)
 November 8 – Archduke Peter Ferdinand of Austria (b. 1874)
 November 9 – Edgar Kennedy, American actor (b. 1890)
 November 10 
 Julius Curtius, German politician, diplomat (b. 1877)
 Jack Nelson, American actor, director (b. 1882)
 November 11 – Fred Niblo, American film director (b. 1874)
 November 12 – Umberto Giordano, Italian composer (b. 1867)
 November 17 – Oerip Soemohardjo, Indonesian general (b. 1893)
 November 21 – Béla Miklós, Hungarian military officer, politician and 38th Prime Minister of Hungary (b. 1890)
 November 23 – Hack Wilson, American baseball player (Chicago Cubs), MLB Hall of Fame member (b. 1900)
 November 28 – D. D. Sheehan, Irish politician (b. 1873)
 November 29 
 Maria Koppenhöfer, German actress (b. 1901)
 Roberto Omegna, Italian cinematographer, director (b. 1876)
 November 30 – Franco Vittadini, Italian composer (b. 1884)

December

 December 3 
 Jan Hendrik Hofmeyr, South African politician (b. 1894)
 Luis Orrego Luco, Chilean politician, lawyer, novelist and diplomat (b. 1866)
 Chano Pozo, Cuban percussionist (b. 1915)
 December 8 – Matthew Charlton, Australian politician (b. 1866)
 December 15 – João Tamagnini Barbosa, Portuguese military officer, politician and 69th Prime Minister of Portugal (b. 1883)
 December 20 – C. Aubrey Smith, British actor (b. 1863)
 December 21 – Władysław Witwicki, Polish psychologist, philosopher, translator, historian (of philosophy and art) and artist (b. 1878)
 December 23 – Japanese war leaders (hanged):
 Kenji Doihara, general (b. 1883)
 Kōki Hirota, diplomat and politician, 32nd Prime Minister of Japan (b. 1878)
 Seishirō Itagaki, military officer (b. 1885)
 Heitarō Kimura, general (b. 1888)
 Iwane Matsui, general (b. 1878)
 Akira Mutō, general (b. 1892)
 Hideki Tojo, general, 40th Prime Minister of Japan (b. 1884)
 December 26 – John Westley, American actor (b. 1878)
 December 28
 Muhammad Saleh Akbar Hydari, Indian civil servant, politician (b. 1894)
 Mahmoud an-Nukrashi Pasha, Egyptian political figure, 27th Prime Minister of Egypt (assassinated) (b. 1888)
 December 30 
 George Ault, American painter (b. 1891)
 Denton Welch, English author and painter (b. 1915)
 December 31 – Sir Malcolm Campbell, English land, water racer (b. 1885)

Nobel Prizes

 Physics – Patrick Maynard Stuart Blackett
 Chemistry – Arne Tiselius
 Medicine – Paul Hermann Müller
 Literature – T. S. Eliot
 Peace – not awarded

References

 
Leap years in the Gregorian calendar